El Rey is a 2004 Colombian-French-Spanish film directed by Antonio Dorado. It was Colombia's submission to the 77th Academy Awards for the Academy Award for Best Foreign Language Film, but was not accepted as a nominee.

See also

Cinema of Colombia
List of submissions to the 77th Academy Awards for Best Foreign Language Film

References

External links

2004 films
2004 drama films
2000s Spanish-language films
Colombian historical drama films
Films shot in Colombia
2000s historical drama films